The Iron Canyon Site is a Miocene assemblage of vertebrate fossils located in Kern County, California within the Dove Spring Formation dating from ~23.03—5.33 Ma.

Specimens located
Proboscidea (Gomphotheriidae)
Gomphotherium 
Rhinocerotidae
Peraceras
Serbelodon S. burnhami
Equidae
Dinohippus
Pliohippus P. tantalus
Megahippus M. matthewi
Amphicyonidae
Ischyrocyon I. mohavensis
Canidae
Epicyon E. saevus
Artiodactyla
Alluvisorex A. chasseae
Paracosoryx P. furlongi
Merychyus 
Lipotyphla
Limnoecus
Erinaceidae
Lagomorpha
Hesperolagomys
Rodentia
Thomomys
Cupidinimus C. avawatzensis, C. tertius
Perognathus P. minutus
Geomyidae 
Eucastor
Copemys C. dentalis, C. longidens, C. russelli

References

David P. Whistler and Douglas P. Burbank, Miocene biostratigraphy and biochronology of the Dove Spring Formation, Mojave Desert, California, and characterization of the Clarendonian mammal age (late Miocene) in California.Website

Miocene California
Miocene paleontological sites of North America
Geology of Kern County, California
Paleontology in California